Irma is a rural locality (a village) in Yershovskoye Rural Settlement, Sheksninsky District, Vologda Oblast, Russia. The population was 12 as of 2010.

Geography 
Irma is located 32 km north of Sheksna (the district's administrative centre) by road. Krasnaya Gorka is the nearest rural locality.

References 

Rural localities in Sheksninsky District